North Lima is an unincorporated community and census-designated place in eastern Beaver Township, Mahoning County, Ohio, United States. The population was 1,369 at the 2020 census. Located at the intersection of State Routes 7, 164, and 165, it is part of the Youngstown–Warren metropolitan area.

Demographics

History
North Lima was laid out around 1826. The name may be a transfer from Lima, New York. A post office called North Lima has been in operation since 1832 which bears the ZIP code of 44452.

The former site of South Range High School is located in the town center. The building is now used to host many of the town's local businesses.

Notable residents
Charlotte Benkner, one of the oldest living persons on record, spent the last few years of her life in North Lima
Bob Mortimer, Christian evangelist
Samuel J. Steiner, draft resister and Mennonite historian

References

Unincorporated communities in Mahoning County, Ohio
1826 establishments in Ohio
Populated places established in 1826
Unincorporated communities in Ohio